Chiang Chieh-an (born 7 July 1968) is a Taiwanese politician who served in the Legislative Yuan from 2018 to 2020.

Personal life
Chiang Chieh-an is of Hakka descent. Her father-in-law was the writer Chung Chao-cheng.

Political career
Chiang Chien-an was appointed to the Legislative Yuan via proportional representation party list, as a representative of the Democratic Progressive Party. She took office on 17 July 2018, succeeding Kolas Yotaka who joined the William Lai-led Executive Yuan as spokesperson. In May 2019, an amendment to the Referendum Act proposed by Chiang was advanced to a second reading without undergoing committee review. The amendment included a clause that required voters to present their National identification card when voting in a referendum. It also called for referendums to be held separately from elections, and only once every two years. The opposition Kuomintang caucus raised concerns about the national identification card requirement, and it was removed before the amendment splitting referendums from elections passed.

References

1968 births
Living people
21st-century Taiwanese women politicians
Members of the 9th Legislative Yuan
Party List Members of the Legislative Yuan
Democratic Progressive Party Members of the Legislative Yuan
Taiwanese politicians of Hakka descent